Nicholas Tse Ting-fung (born 29 August 1980) is a Hong Kong actor, martial artist, singer, songwriter, entrepreneur and chef. As multi talented celebrity, he became a TV chef and food critic in 2014.
Tse initially entered the entertainment industry in 1996 as a singer. He learned martial arts from Philip Ng, Andy On, and Sammo Hung, stunts from Jackie Chan, and martial arts for the screen and television from Chung Chi Li. Tse made his film debut in 1998 with the crime film Young and Dangerous: The Prequel, for which he received the Hong Kong Film Award for Best New Performer for his performance. In 2003, Tse founded Post Production Office Limited, a special effects company in Hong Kong which provides services for movies, video games, and advertisements. The company grossed over one billion Hong Kong dollars, and has since been sold.

In 2011, he won the Hong Kong Film Award for Best Actor for his performance in the film The Stool Pigeon, making him the first person ever to have won all of the following three Hong Kong Film awards: Best Actor, Best Supporting Actor and Best New Performer.

Early life
Tse was born in Hong Kong on 29 August 1980 to famous Hong Kong actor Patrick Tse and actress Deborah Lee. His younger sister is Jennifer Tse. Tse moved to Vancouver, British Columbia, Canada at eight years old. He attended St. George's School, Vancouver, but moved with his family to Hong Kong. Nicholas later attended Hong Kong International School for one year before dropping out due to low grades in grade 10. For a year he lived in Phoenix, Arizona, but was expelled for his poor academic performance. He studied music in Japan before returning to Hong Kong. He currently holds Hong Kong citizenship after giving up Canadian citizenship as part of the Chinese government crackdown on the entertainment industry.

Career

Music
In 1995, at age 14, Tse attended a series of concerts at the Hong Kong Coliseum from Faye Wong, who was entering the prime of her career at age 24. He became, in his own words, obsessed with the pop star; the two would become romantic partners decades later. In 1996, Tse was singing at a party for a family friend when he was discovered by Albert Yeung, the head of Emperor Entertainment Group. In 1997, Tse signed a record deal with EEG under the Fitto label and released his first album, My Attitude. The album was ranked 3rd on the top selling CD chart of IFPI. In the same year of his debut, he won the most popular new artist award.

Tse achieved mainstream success in 1998 with songs like "早知" (Knew It Would Be Like That) and "如果只得一星期" (If There's Only One Week) and became a prominent heartthrob in the entertainment industry. He received a musical award during the 1999 Jade Solid Gold Top 10 Awards with his popular song "非走不可" (No Choice But To Leave), recorded on 27 September 1993.

In 2000, Tse released the album with the main hit single "活著 VIVA", which was regarded as his most popular song ever, and furthered his career significantly. After the release of this song, he became widely regarded as an A-list singer. In 2001, he released the album "玉蝴蝶" (Jade Butterfly), which included two hit songs, "玉蝴蝶" and "潛龍勿用". 

In 2002, Tse received the World's Best Chinese Artist award at the 2002 World Music Award for the success of his Jade Butterfly album.

Film
Tse's most notable films have included Young and Dangerous: The Prequel (1998), Gen-X Cops (1999), Time and Tide (2000), and Invisible Target (2007). He also collaborated with Jackie Chan in New Police Story (2004). Tse has also acted in romance films including Tiramisu (2002) and Jade Goddess of Mercy (2003). Late in his career, he ventured into comedic roles in Enter the Phoenix (2004), A Chinese Tall Story (2005), and McDull, the Alumni (2006). In the Hong Kong translated version of A Bug's Life, Tse did the voice dubbing for the character Flik. He also lent his voice to the Chinese animation film Lotus Lantern (1999). Tse's performance in Bodyguards and Assassins (2009), earned him an Asian Film Award at the 4th Asian Film Awards for Best Supporting Actor, and in 2011, Tse received a Hong Kong Film Award for Best Actor at the 30th Hong Kong Film Awards for The Stool Pigeon (2010), beating fellow actors Chow Yun-fat, Jacky Cheung, Tony Leung Ka-fai, and Nick Cheung. Tse had a love for martial arts at a young age, but he formally learned martial arts for the screen from stunt leader Jackie Chan and Chung Chi Li for films such as, Gen-X-Cops and Invisible Target. He worked with Donnie Yen for martial arts film, Dragon Tiger Gate. He still practices martial arts for the screen and exercise. He's also a Wing Chun practitioner, being trained by fellow co-star and friend Philip Ng alongside co-star and friend Andy On.

Television series
Tse has starred in two TVB Hong Kong local dramas, Aiming High and The Monkey King: Quest for the Sutra. He also participated in a documentary produced by Television Broadcasts Limited called On the Road II , made in Cambodia in 2007. The rest of his drama series were filmed and produced by companies in Mainland China. Most of Tse's dramas are wuxia series, a genre of fantasy Chinese fiction concerning the adventures of martial artists in ancient China.

Artistry
On 12 January 2006, wax statues of Tse were first exhibited along with seven other well known Chinese figures including basketball star Yao Ming, and Jackie Chan at the Madame Tussauds in London. On 19 June 2006, wax statues of both Tse and his then wife Cecilia Cheung were revealed in Shanghai exhibition in Shanghai.

In November 2012, Tse attended a Hong Kong Avenue of Stars Hand Imprint Ceremony.

Musical style
Most of Tse's songs were based on the Cantopop rock genre such as some of his top hits "front, back, left, right" (前前後後左左右右), "Exposure" (曝光), and "Lonely Base" (寂寞堂口). Some of his songs were produced in Tse's own 'Nic Production', which was revealed in several TVB interviews. Tse featured his flame guitar and a flamethrower in the music video of his widely popular song and one of his most classical pop rock songs, "Live Viva" (活著 VIVA).

He has sung a number of duets with fellow Cantopop singers, namely "Love" (愛) with Charlene Choi, "Second Life" (第二世), "Amen" (阿門) both with Joey Yung, "Kid" (細路) with Eason Chan,  "You Can't Stop Me" with Sam Lee and Stephen Fung, and "Beauty and the Beast" with Meilin.

Besides being a singer, Tse has shown his interest and talent in songwriting. Plenty of his songs were produced by himself, either of the lyrics or the melody or both. For example, Tse composed and arranged the melodies for his most renowned Mandarin songs, "I love you because I love you" (因為愛所以愛) and "Huang Zhong Ren" (黃種人). Tse also participated in the creation of lyrics in "Huang Zhong Ren".

Personal life
Tse began the process of renouncing his Canadian citizenship in September 2021. He had acquired dual Hong Kong-Canadian citizenship after moving to Canada in his youth.

Relationships
Tse began a relationship with musician Faye Wong, 11 years his senior, in the late 1990s. They broke up in 2002. 

On 31 July 2006, Tse confirmed that he was dating actress Cecilia Cheung in an interview with Hong Kong commercial radio station 881/903. On 29 September 2006, Tse was photographed with his wedding ring at the Hong Kong International Airport, announcing that he and Cecilia Cheung married in a secret wedding ceremony in Pamalican, Philippines. They have two sons: Lucas, born on 2 August 2007, and Quintus, born on 12 May 2010. On 14 June 2011, Tse reportedly filed for divorce from Cheung. 

In 2014, it was reported that Tse had rekindled his relationship with Faye Wong, who had divorced her second husband in 2013. As of 2020, Tse and Faye Wong continue to reside together.

2002 motoring incident
In the early morning of 23 March 2002, Tse crashed his Ferrari 360 Modena in Hong Kong Central. Initially, it was claimed that his driver was responsible for the crash, but further investigation by the ICAC revealed that the story was fabricated, involving three other men and a police officer. Officer Lau Chi-Wai was sentenced to six months in prison. Tse spent two weeks in prison and was sentenced to 240 hours of community service for obstruction of justice. The 240 hours portion of his sentence was the maximum punishment for this offence, given that Tse was a young offender at the time (21 years and 7 months). This incident had caused him to have a downfall in popularity. Tse had said that money to him has gone down 
by 40% since the accident. The car was originally a gift from the company EEG, as Tse himself accounted for 56% of the revenue.

2002 assault allegations
Tse has had his share of brush-ups with "paparazzi". A photographer of Sudden Weekly magazine accused Tse of hitting him outside a restaurant in Taiwan, bruising his nose and elbow. Although Tse denied the assault charge, there was a settlement in July 2002.

2003 motoring incident
Tse had another accident in 2003, where he crashed his Toyota Camry into Wan Chai train station. He was banned from driving for six months and fined HK$4000 for reckless driving. Prior to this incident, he was fined HK$7000 and had his license suspended for a year because he had two separate charges for speeding.

2005 motoring incident
He later had another accident in November 2005, where he collided with a Public Security Bureau Bus in an Audi RS4 in Lantau. He was banned from driving for another six months and fined HK$4,000, again for reckless driving. After this police charge, Tse released the album Reborn.

2008 Edison Chen photo scandal
In February 2008, Tse's wife, Cecilia Cheung, was caught up in the Edison Chen photo scandal, when intimate photographs of her were widely distributed on the internet.

2016 Friend of Michelin honours 
On 28 October 2016, Tse was honoured as the first ever "Friend of Michelin", awarded for Michelin-star-worthy non-professional chefs and restaurateurs. On 30 November 2017, he prepared the dessert course for A Night Among the Stars, a seven course gala dinner with Michelin-star chefs Alain Ducasse, Kwong Wai-keung, Tam Kwok-fung, Fabrice Vulin, Hidemichi Seki, and Noah Sandoval.

Discography

Cantonese albums
 My Attitude (1997)
 Horizons (1998)
 Believe (1999)
 Zero Distance (2000)
 Viva (2000)
 Senses (2001)
  Jade Butterfly (2001)
 Me (2002)
 Reborn (2003)
 One Inch Closer (2005)

Mandarin albums
 Grateful for Your Love '99 (1999)
 Understand (2000)
 The Prophecy (2001)
 Listen Up (2004)
 Release (2005)
 Last (2009)
 Chef Nic (2015)

Filmography

Film

Television

References

External links

 

1980 births
Living people
20th-century Hong Kong male actors
20th-century Hong Kong male singers
21st-century Hong Kong male actors
21st-century Hong Kong male singers
Best Supporting Actor Asian Film Award winners
Businesspeople from Vancouver

Cantopop singer-songwriters
Hong Kong Buddhists
Hong Kong emigrants to Canada
Hong Kong film producers
Hong Kong male film actors

Hong Kong male singer-songwriters
Hong Kong male television actors

Hong Kong Mandopop singer-songwriters
Hong Kong philanthropists
Hong Kong rock musicians
Male actors from Vancouver
Musicians from Vancouver
Naturalized citizens of Canada
People from Panyu District
St. George's School (Vancouver) alumni
Wing Chun practitioners from Hong Kong
Hong Kong idols